The Lords of Salem may refer to:

 "The Lords of Salem" (song), a 2006 song by Rob Zombie
 The Lords of Salem (film), a 2013 film, directed by Rob Zombie